Najm Abdulkarim (Arabic: نجم عبد الكريم, born: October 25, 1938) is a Kuwaiti writer and journalist.

Early life 
Najm Abdulkarim was born on 25 October 1938 in Kuwait. He comes from a Bedoon family with Iraqi origins. His brother Musafer Abdulkarim was executed by the Kuwaiti regime following the liberation of Kuwait from Iraq after he had been accused of collaborating with the Iraqi regime during the Iraqi Invasion of Kuwait.

Career 
His career as a journalist and radio host spanned more than five decades. He worked for Radio Kuwait, interviewing influential writers and other artists like Taha Hussein. He also worked for the Kuwait Television as a director of cinema and entertainment.

He wrote the questions for the Arabic version of Who Wants to Be a Millionaire? TV program. At one point, he was considered for presenting the program, but the producer preferred a more popular figure in the Arab world.

Personal life

Listing on Iraqi Baathist Party's Assassination List
His opposition to Saddam's regime during the 1980s was public. He even wrote a poem comparing the party to "cancer" which made him targeted and listed on the party's assassination list. 

He married twice. He has two daughters and a son from his first marriage—Lana, Lina, and Amjad. He also has two daughters from his second marriage—Amira and Hiba.

Books 
Najm wrote two nonfiction books:
 Shakhsiyyat A'araftuha wa Hawartuha (lit. Notable People I knew and Interviewed, 2012) 
 Udaba Min Al A'alam: Gharaaeb Maesawiyya, Siyyar wa Hikayat Asrar Abeqera wa U'dhama ((lit. The World's Writers: their Tragedies, Stories, and Secrets, 2014)

Plays 
Najm Abdulkarim directed two plays:
 Bani Samt (1975)
 Hakamat Mahkamutu Al Sultan

Acting 
He appeared in two movies
 Hobbi Fi Al Qahera (1963)
 Al Rajul Al Hadidi (1981)

References 

1938 births
Kuwaiti_writers
Kuwaiti_journalists
Living people